Leo Ezerins (born August 10, 1956) was a linebacker who played ten seasons in the Canadian Football League for the Winnipeg Blue Bombers and the Hamilton Tiger-Cats.

Background

Ezerins is a graduate of Whitworth College in Spokane, Washington graduating with a BA in Economics and Business. He was a conference all-star four times and an NAIA All American. His head coach was CFL legend, Hugh Campbell.

A gifted athlete he was also a three-time Canadian Champion Speed Skating Champion, Provincial High School basketball All-Star twice and played on the Isaac Brock Provincial Little League Championship team and the Winnipeg Hawkeyes Juvenile Little Grey Cup Championship team.

Professional career

Ezerins  is currently the all time interception leader for Canadian linebackers and fifth overall for all CFL linebackers. He was an integral member of the Tiger-Cats 1986 Grey Cup winning team. He recovered the first fumble of the game caused by Grover Covington which set the pace for an incredible defensive onslaught of the heavily favored Edmonton Eskimos. That year, he was named a CFL Eastern All Star.

Awards
Named – #46 Globe and Mail Sports Power 50 – 2011 
Named – Honorary Member Princess Patricia Canadian Light Infantry – 2011 
Named- Leo Ezerins Award – Isaac Brock Community Center, Winnipeg, MB - 2010

Life After Retirement
Ezerins is the poster boy for a University Health Network study on the effect of head hits on CFL players to be studied for long term concussion effects. Ezerins helps promote concussion awareness for all sports.

Personal

A Winnipeg native, Ezerins now calls  Hamilton Home with his life partner Sandra Shields. He has two adult children, Katie and Dillon. Recently he was named to the Globe and Mail's Power 50, a Member of the 100th Grey Cup Steering Committee, Honorary Member of the PPCLI Foundation, Member of the Canadian Sports Concussion Research Project (Chaired by Dr. Charles Tator), a nominee to the Hamilton Tiger-Cats All Time Team and Manitoba Football Hall of Fame inductee.

References

External links
 http://www.ticats.ca/index.php?module=newser&func=display&topicnum=&nid=11326&writer=0
 http://www.cflapedia.com/Players/e/ezerins_leo.htm

Winnipeg Blue Bombers players
Hamilton Tiger-Cats players
Canadian football linebackers
Players of Canadian football from Manitoba
Canadian football people from Winnipeg
1956 births
Living people
Whitworth Pirates football players